Bhutan participated in the 2018 Asian Games in Jakarta and Palembang, Indonesia from 18 August to 2 September 2018. Bhutan first competed at the Asian Games in 1986 Seoul. At the last edition of 2014 Asian Games in Incheon, South Korea, a total of 16 Bhutanese athletes took part in seven different sports. This time, 24 Bhutanese athletes will compete in four different sports including archery, boxing, taekwondo and golf.

Archer Karma was the nation's flag bearer at the opening ceremony.

Competitors 
The following is a list of the number of competitors representing Bhutan that participated at the Games:

Archery 

Recurve

Compound

Boxing 

Men

Women

Golf 

Men

Taekwondo 

Bhutan entered eight taekwondo practioniers (five men and three women). All competed in the kyorugi events. 

Kyorugi
Men

Women

See also
 Bhutan at the 2018 Asian Para Games

References 

Nations at the 2018 Asian Games
2018
Asian Games